Priscilla Morand is a Mauritian judoka. She won the gold medal in the women's 48 kg event at the 2022 African Judo Championships held in Oran, Algeria. In 2021, she won the silver medal in her event at the African Judo Championships held in Dakar, Senegal. She also won one of the bronze medals in this event in 2014, 2019 and 2020.

Achievements

References

External links 
 

Living people
Year of birth missing (living people)
Place of birth missing (living people)
Mauritian female judoka